Katakara may refer to
 Katakara Road, a road in Mityana, Uganda
 A fictional samurai clan in the 2010 action video game Red Steel 2